The AY-3-8500 "Ball & Paddle" integrated circuit was the first in a series of ICs from General Instrument designed for the consumer video game market. These chips were designed to output video to an RF modulator, which would then display the game on a domestic television set. The AY-3-8500 contained six selectable games — tennis (a.k.a. Pong), soccer, squash, practice, and two rifle shooting games. The AY-3-8500 was the 625-line PAL version and the AY-3-8500-1 was the 525-line NTSC version. It was introduced in 1976, Coleco becoming the first customer having been introduced to the IC development by Ralph H. Baer. A minimum number of external components were needed to build a complete system.

The AY-3-8500 was the first version. It played seven Pong variations. The video was in black-and-white, although it was possible to colorize the game by using an additional chip, such as the AY-3-8515.

Games

Six selectable games for one or two players were included:

In addition, a seventh undocumented game could be played when none of the previous six was selected: Handicap, a soccer variant where the player on the right has a third paddle. This game was implemented on very few systems.

Usage

The AY-3-8500 was designed to be powered by six 1.5 V cells (9 V). Its specified operation is at 6-7 V and a maximum of 12 V instead of the 5 V standard for logic. The nominal clock was 2.0 MHz, yielding a 500 ns pixel width. One way to generate such a clock is to divide a 14.31818 MHz 4 × colorburst clock by 7, producing 2.04545 MHz. It featured independent video outputs for left player, right player, ball, and playground+counter, that were summed using resistors, allowing designers to use a different luminance for each one. It was housed in a standard 28-pin DIP.

Applications
Some of the dedicated consoles employing the AY-3-8500 (there are at least two hundred different consoles using this chip):

 Sears Hockey Pong
Coleco Telstar series (Coleco Telstar, Coleco Telstar Classic, Coleco Telstar Deluxe, Coleco Telstar Ranger, Coleco Telstar Alpha, Coleco Telstar Colormatic, Coleco Telstar Regent, Coleco Telstar Sportsman)
Odyssey series (Magnavox Odyssey 300, Magnavox Odyssey 2000 and Magnavox Odyssey 3000)
 RadioShack TV Scoreboard
 Unisonic Sportsman/Tournament
Philips Tele-Game ES 2203 Las Vegas and Philips Tele-Game ES 2204 Las Vegas
Play-O-Tronic
 Videomaster (Strika, Strika 2,ColourScore 2, SuperScore)
 APF TV Fun (Model 401)
 Sportsmaster TVG 901
 Prinztronic Micro Ten Deluxe Colour TV Game (United Kingdom)
Ameprod Television Game 10 (one of a few consoles made in Poland)
Adman Grandstand TV game 2000
 Bildschirmspiel 01, the GDR's only game console

AY-3-8550
The AY-3-8550 was the next chip released by General Instruments. It featured horizontal player motion, and a composite video output. It was pin compatible with the AY-3-8500. It needed an additional AY-3-8515 chip to output video in color.

Games

Six selectable games for one or two players were included:

Usage
The AY-3-8550 used the No Connect pins from the AY-3-8500, so it was possible to put an AY-3-8550 on an AY-3-8500 (without horizontal movement), and vice versa.

Application 
This is a list of consoles that use this chip:

Tele-Game ES 2208 Las Vegas

AY-3-8610

The AY-3-8610 was a major update from General Instruments. It played more games (10), like basketball or hockey, with higher-quality graphics. It was nicknamed "Superstar" by GI. It was in black and white, although it was possible to add color by using an additional AY-3-8615 chip.

Prior to producing the 8610, GI created the AY-3-8600. The pin configuration was the same as the 8610, but it was missing the two rifle/target games, bringing the total number of games down to 8.

Games
 
The 10 selectable games for this chip included:

Usage
The AY-3-8610 featured a completely different pinout. It, too, required an external crystal oscillator. It still had separate video output pins, and removed the dedicated sync pin.

Application
This is a list of consoles that use the AY-3-8610:

 Binatone TV-Master MK 8 e 10
 Grandstand Sports Centre 6000
 Match Color
 Telejogo II
 Universum Color Multi-Spiel 4010 e 4014
 Videomaster Sportsworld
 Hanimex TVG-8610
 Interstate 1110
 ITT/Ideal Tele-Match Cassette 2
 Polycon C 4016
 Serie PC-50x
 Radofin Colour TV Game
 Radofin Tele-Sports III
 Saft-Leclanché TV 8 Sports
 TV 18 - 18 Spannende Videospiele C-4016
 TV 2018 Color - 18 Spannende Videospiele 441/2

Some consoles that use the AY-3-8600 chip:

 Coleco Telstar Galaxy
 Creatronic Bi.Bip 8
 Enterprex Color Home Video Game Apollo 2004
 Magnavox Odyssey 4000
 Philips Tele-Game ES 2218 Las Vegas
 Ricochet Electronic Ricochet 8
 Roberts Sportrama 8
 Unisonic Olympian 2600

Derivatives

 An equivalent to the AY-3-8500 is the TMS1965NLA manufactured by Texas Instruments.
 The Soviet K145IK17 has a built-in counter, making it possible to use a momentary pushbutton instead of a multi-position switch to select games. The handicap game is not hidden, it can be chosen among others using this button. Since a pushbutton occupies only one pin, this IC has fewer pins.
 A competitor was the National Semiconductor MM57105.

References

External links
 Full datasheets with reference designs and application notes
 Abridged AY-3-8500 Data Sheet
 Emulator

Integrated circuits